Supply network operations are the synchronized execution of compliant manufacturing and logistics processes across a dynamically reconfigurable supply network to profitably meet demand.supply network

References

Supply chain management